Sadasiva Brahmendra was a saint, composer of Carnatic music and Advaita philosopher who lived near Kumbakonam, Tamil Nadu, during the 18th century. Only a few of his compositions have survived, but they are recognised as great compositions of Carnatic music.

Life 
Sadasiva was born into a Telugu Brahmin couple Moksha Somasundara Avadhaani and Parvati. His initial name was Sivaramakrishna. He was married at the age of 17. Sadasiva lived in Kumbakonam, in Tamil Nadu in the 17th to 18th century. He went to learn vedas and other various subjects in Sanskrit in Thiruvisanallur. His contemporaries such as Sridhara Ayyavaal and Sri Bhagvan Nama Bodendral lived in the nearby areas at that time.

Shiva ramakrishna left his home in search of Truth. He became the sishya of Sri Paramasivendra Saraswati. He started aathma vichara and received mahavaakya upadesas from his guru. After taking sanyasa, he is said to have wandered around, naked or semi-naked, and often in a trance-like state. He was reclusive and often meditated, and was described as being in a "supremely intoxicated state". He is said to have performed many miracles whilst alive, some of the most prominent are provided below. His jiva samadhi site is briefly mentioned in 'Autobiography of a Yogi', Chapter 41 by Paramahamsa Yogananda.

On the river banks of Cauvery in Mahadhanapuram, he was asked by some children to be taken to Madurai, more than 100 miles away, for an annual festival. The saint asked them to close their eyes, and a few seconds later they reopened their eyes and found they were in Madurai. He also wrote the Atma Vidya Vilasa, an advaitic work.

There is an epilogue to this story. The next day, another youth, incredulous at hearing this story, asked Sadasiva to take him also to this festival. It is said that the youth immediately found himself in the distant city. When it was time to return, Sadasiva was nowhere to be found. The youth had to make his way back on foot.

Whilst relaxing near a heap of grains, he began meditating. The farmer who owned the land mistook Sadasiva for a thief, and confronted him. The farmer raised his stick to hit the saint, but became a statue. He remained in this state until the morning, when Sadasiva finished meditating and smiled at the farmer. The farmer was restored to his normal state, and asked the saint for forgiveness.

At another time, while meditating on the banks of the Cauvery river, he was carried away by a sudden flood. Weeks later, when some villagers were digging near a mound of earth, their shovels struck his body. He woke up and walked away.

Temple service

He is said to have met the Raja Thondaiman of Pudukottai and initiated him into the Dakshinamurthy Mantra. He is said to have written the mantra on sand. This sand was picked up by the king and it is in the worship of the royal family till now in the Dakshinamoorthy temple inside the Pudukottai palace in Pudukottai.

He was responsible for installing the deity Punnainallur Mariamman near Thanjavur and guided the installation at Devadanapatti Kamakshi temple. He was also involved in the thanthonimalai Kalyana Venkatesa Perumal temple at Karur. He also installed the Hanuman Murthi in the Prasanna Venkateswara temple at Nalu Kal Mandapam in Thanjavur. He instructed king of Tanjore to start the Saraswathi Mahal Library which runs till date.

He also installed Lord Ganesh and a powerful Ganesh Yantra at the Thirunageshwaram Rahu Stalam temple at Kumbakonam. An inscription in the temple bears testimony to this fact. The shrine can still be seen at the entrance to the temple.

There is a shrine for him in the Nandrudayan Vinayaka Temple, Trichy.

He has five samadhis :
 Nerur (Tamil Nadu)
 Manamadurai 
 Omkareshwar
 Kashi
 Karachi

Every year in Nerur and Manamadurai, music festivals are conducted in his honor. In Manamadurai his samadhi is located at the Somanathar temple

Sri Sri Sacchidananda Shivabhinava Nrusimha Bharati, pontiff of the Sringeri Saradha Peetham had visited Nerur and composed two slokas in praise of Sri Sadasiva Bramhendra - Sadasivendra Stava and Sadasivendra Pancharatna

Sri Vasudevanand Saraswati ,known as Tembe swami, a great saint of Maharashtra visited Nerur in the year 1907 and composed a hymn on Sadasiva Brahmendral. This incident is mentioned in his biography.

Books
He is the author of several works. The following works have been printed/published.

 Brahmasūtra-vṛtti or brahma-tattva-prakāśikā - A commentary on Brahma Sutras
 Yoga-sudhākara which is a commentary on the Yoga Sūtras of Patañjali.
 Siddhānta-kalpa-valli
 Advaita-rasa-mañjari
$ Kaivalya Amrita Bindu based on teachings of upanishads
 ātmānusandhānam
 ātma vidyā vilāsa
 Shiva mānasa pūjā
 Dakshinamurtty Dhyanam
 Swapnoditam
 Navamanimala
 Navavarnaratnamala
 Swanubhuti prakashika
 Mano niyamana
 Paramahamsa charya
 Shiva yoga Dipika
 Suta Samhita Sangraha
 Manisha Panchaka Vyakhyana (Tatparya Dipika)

The following works are ascribed to Sri Brahmendral but no printed version is available.

 Bhagavata sara
 Saparya paryaya stavah
 Atmanatma viveka prakashika
 Bodharya Prakarana
 Gita ratnamala - A Commentary on Bhagavat Gita

Songs

He also wrote several Carnatic compositions to spread the advaita philosophy among common people.  These songs are renowned for depth in content as well as brevity of expression. His compositions are quite popular and can be heard frequently in Carnatic music concerts though they are not always rendered in the same raga since the same song has sometimes been set to music by various artists. Some of these are

 Ananda Purna Bodhoham Sachchidananda - Shankarabharanam
 Ananda Purna Bodhoham Satatam	- Madhyamavati
 Bhajare Gopalam - Hindolam
 Bhajare Raghuviram - Kalyani
 Bhajare Yadunatham - Peelu
 Brahmaivaham	- Nadanamakriya
 Bruhi Mukundethi - Gowla, Navaroju, Kurinji, Senchurutti
 Chetah Sreeramam - Dwijavanthi / Surati
 Chinta Nasti Kila - Navroj
 Gayathi Vanamali - Gavathi, Yamuna Kalyani
 Khelathi Brahmande - Sindhubhairavi
 Khelathi Mama Hrudaye - Atana
 Kridathi Vanamali - Sindhubhairavi
 Krishna Paahi - Madhyamavati
 Manasa Sanchara Re -Sama
 Nahi Re Nahi Re - Gavathi
 Pibare Rama Rasam - Ahir Bhairav or Yamunakalyani
 Poorna Bodhoham - Kalyani
 Prativaram Varam - Todi
 Sarvam Bramha Mayam - Mishra Sivaranjani
 Smaravaram - Jog or Sindhubhairavi
 Sthiratha Nahi Nahire - Amruthavarshini
 Tatvat Jeevitham - Keeravani
 Tunga Tarange Gange - Hamsadhwani

In the movies

Character of Sadasiva Bramhendra is portrayed in the Tamil movie Mahashakti Mariamman

In popular culture

Sivan Sir has written a detailed life history of Sri Brahmendral in his book "Yenipadigalil Manithargal",

Tamil writer Balakumaran has written a novel Thozhan based on the life of Sri Sadasiva Brahmendra.

Printed Sources
Sadasiva Brahman, the Silent Sage, Cuttān̲anta Pāratiyār, 1967

See also
Sadasiva Brahmendra Swami Temple

References

Further reading

External links
 Sri Kailasha Ashramam   
 SADASIVA BRAHMENDRA SARASVATI by N. RAGHUNATHAN M.A., B.L.  
 Santa Shreshta Sadasiva Bramhendra and his miracles  

Carnatic composers
18th-century Hindu religious leaders
People from Thanjavur district
Scholars from Tamil Nadu
1755 deaths
Advaita Vedanta
Advaitin philosophers
Indian Hindu monks